Being an Islamic country, Pakistan is home to thousands of mosques. Some of the mosques are quite famous because of their size, beauty, architecture and history. The following is a list of mosques in Pakistan.

See also 

 Islam in Pakistan
 Lists of mosques
 Mosques of Lahore

References 

 
 
Mosques